Club Universal, is a Paraguayan football club based in the city of Encarnación, in the Itapúa Department. The club actually participates in the League of Encarnación.

The club was founded May 14, 1917 and plays in the regional Liga Encarnacena of the Itapúa Department. The team managed to play in the first division in 2000 but got relegated soon after. Their home games are played at the Hugo Stroessner stadium.

Honors
Paraguayan Second Division: 1
1999

Notable players
To appear in this section a player must have either:
 Played at least 125 games for the club.
 Set a club record or won an individual award while at the club.
 Been part of a national team at any time.
 Played in the first division of any other football association (outside of Paraguay).
 Played in a continental and/or intercontinental competition.

1990's
Ninguno
2000's
  Carlos Guirland (2000)
  Juan Cardozo (2000–2003)
  Juan Peralta (2003)
  Manuel Maciel (2004)
  Juan Iturbe (2005–2006)
  Tomás Bartomeus (2005–2006)
  Pablo Caballero Caceres (2006–2007)
2010's
Ninguno

References

External links
Club Universal Info

Football clubs in Paraguay
Association football clubs established in 1917
Club Universal